Ismael Rescalvo Sánchez (born 2 March 1982) is a Spanish retired footballer who played as a central defender, and is the manager of Bolivian club The Strongest.

Career
Born in Valencia, Rescalvo joined Levante UD's youth setup at the age of 14. After representing Massamagrell UD and CF Torre Levante, he retired at the age of 28 due to an injury. After retiring he worked at La Creu CF and Levante's youth setup before returning to Torre Levante in 2012, taking over the club's Juvenil squad.

On 10 July 2013, Rescalvo was appointed manager of Torre Levante's first team in Tercera División. After avoiding relegation in his first two seasons, he took the club to a ninth position in his third, the club's best ever position in the league until then.

On 3 June 2016, Rescalvo was presented as the new manager of Categoría Primera A side Envigado FC. He resigned on 2 August of the following year, he took over Independiente Medellín as an interim manager on 16 October 2017.

Rescalvo was definitely appointed manager of DIM on 28 November 2017, but was dismissed the following 6 June. On 28 June 2018, he switched teams and countries again after being named manager of Independiente del Valle and since April 2019 he was appointed manager of Emelec.

On 25 November 2022, Rescalvo left Emelec on a mutual agreement. On 8 December, he was presented as manager of Bolivian side The Strongest.

Personal life
Rescalvo's twin brother Juan was also a footballer. A midfielder, he was also groomed at Levante.

References

External links

1984 births
Living people
Twin sportspeople
Spanish twins
Footballers from Valencia (city)
Spanish footballers
Association football defenders
CF Torre Levante players
Spanish football managers
Envigado F.C. managers
Independiente Medellín managers
C.S.D. Independiente del Valle managers
C.S. Emelec managers
The Strongest managers
Spanish expatriate football managers
Spanish expatriates in Colombia
Spanish expatriate sportspeople in Ecuador
Spanish expatriate sportspeople in Bolivia
Expatriate football managers in Colombia
Expatriate football managers in Ecuador
Expatriate football managers in Bolivia